Freadelpha murrayi is a species of beetle in the family Cerambycidae. It was described by Chevrolat in 1855. It is known from Gabon, Cameroon, and Nigeria.

References

Sternotomini
Beetles described in 1855